Arturo Umberto Illia (4 August 1900 – 18 January 1983) was an Argentine politician and physician, who was President of Argentina from 12 October 1963, to 28 June 1966. He was a member of the centrist Radical Civic Union.

Illia reached the presidency of the Nation in elections controlled by the Armed Forces in which Peronism was outlawed and while the previous constitutional president Arturo Frondizi was detained. During his government, the national industry was promoted, 23% of the national budget was allocated to education (the highest figure in the history of the country), unemployment fell, the external debt decreased, a literacy plan was carried out and sanctioned the Minimum, Vital and Mobile Salary law and the Medications Laws.

He was noted for his honesty and trustworthiness, an example of this being the fact that Illia lived almost all his life in his humble home in Cruz del Eje, where he devoted himself to medicine, and that he never used his influence to his advantage, to the point such as having to sell his car while in office and refusing to use public funds to finance his medical treatments. After his government, he maintained his active political militancy, rejected the retirement perks he had earned as president, and returned home to continue dedicating himself to medicine.

Biography

Arturo Umberto Illia was born in Pergamino, Buenos Aires, to Emma Francesconi and Martín Illia, Italian immigrants from the Lombardy Region.

He enrolled in the School of Medicine at the University of Buenos Aires in 1918. That year, he joined the movement for University reform in Argentina (Reforma Universitaria), which first emerged in the city of Córdoba, and set the basis for a free, open and public university system less influenced by the Catholic Church. This development changing the concept and administration of higher education in Argentina, and in a good portion of Latin America.

As a part of his medical studies, Illia begun working in the San Juan de Dios Hospital in the city of La Plata, obtaining his degree in 1927.

In 1928 he had an interview with President Hipólito Yrigoyen, the longtime leader of the centrist UCR, and the first freely-elected President of Argentina. Illia offered him his services as a physician, and Yrigoyen, in turn, offered him a post as railroad physician in different parts of the country, upon which Illia decided to move to scenic Cruz del Eje, in Cordoba Province. He worked there as a physician from 1929 until 1963, except for three years (1940–1943) in which he was Vice-Governor of the province.

Family 
On 15 February 1939, he married Silvia Elvira Martorell, and had three children: Emma Silvia, Martín Arturo and Leandro Hipólito. Martín Illia was elected to Congress in 1995, and served until his death in 1999.

Gabriela Michetti, elected Vice President in 2015, is a great-grandniece of Illia.

Political activities
Arturo Illia became a member of the Radical Civic Union when he reached adulthood, in 1918, under the strong influence of the radical militancy of his father and of his brother, Italo.
That same year, he began his university studies, with the events of the aforementioned Universitarian Reform taking place in the country.

From 1929 onwards, after moving to Cruz del Eje, he began intense political activity, which he alternated with his professional life. In 1935 he was elected Provincial Senator for the Department of Cruz del Eje, in the elections that took place on 17 November. In the Provincial Senate, he actively participated in the approval of the Law of Agrarian Reform, which was passed in the Córdoba Legislature but rejected in the National Congress.

He was also head of the Budget and Treasury Commission, and pressed for the construction of dams, namely Nuevo San Roque, La Viña, Cruz del Eje and Los Alazanes.

In the elections that took place on 10 March 1940, he was elected Vice-Governor of Córdoba Province, with Santiago del Castillo, who became governor. He occupied this post until the provincial government was replaced by the newly installed dictatorship of General Pedro Ramírez, in 1943.

From 1948 to 1952, Illia served in the Argentine Chamber of Deputies. Working in a Congress dominated by the Peronist Party, he took an active part in the Public Works, Hygiene and Medical Assistance Commissions.

Election as President of Argentina 

After the fall of the government of Juan Perón in 1955, a long period of political instability took over Argentina.

From 1955 to 1963 the country had five presidents. Frondizi governed the country from 1 May 1958, until 29 March 1962, when he was overthrow by a military coup. Frondizi's removal was precipitated by his lifting the ban on Peronism ahead of the March 1962 mid-term elections.
After Frondizi the President of the Senate José María Guido became interim President of the country, starting a process of 'normalization' which eventually led to new elections on 7 July 1963.

The 1963 elections were made possible by support from the moderate, "Blue" faction ( Azules) of the Argentine military, led by the Head of the Joint Chiefs, General Juan Carlos Onganía and by the Internal Affairs Minister, General Osiris Villegas.  The UCR had been divided since their contentious 1956 convention into the mainstream "People's UCR" (UCRP) and the center-left UCRI. The leader of the UCRP, Ricardo Balbín, withdrew his name from the March 10 nominating convention and instead supported a less conservative, less anti-Peronist choice, and the party nominated Dr. Illia for President and Entre Ríos Province lawyer Carlos Perette as his running-mate.

In the electoral college on 31 July 1963, the Illia-Perette ticket obtained 169 votes out of 476 on the first round of voting (70 short of an absolute majority), but the support of three centrist parties on the second round gave them 270 votes, thus formalizing their election.

Illia assumed the presidency on 12 October 1963.

Presidency

1963 general election 

Arturo Illia became president on 12 October 1963, and promptly steered a moderate political course, while remaining mindful of the spectre of a coup d'état. A UCRP majority in the Senate contrasted with their 73 seats in the 192-seat Lower House, a disadvantage complicated by Illia's refusal to include UCRI men in the cabinet (which, save for Internal Affairs Minister Juan Palmero, would all be figures close to Balbín). Illia also refused military requests to have a general put in charge of the Federal District Police, though he confirmed Onganía as Head of the Joint Chiefs of Staff and named numerous "Blue" generals to key posts.

Countering military objections, he made political rights an early policy centerpiece, however. His first act consisted in eliminating all restrictions over Peronism and its allied political parties, causing anger and surprise among the military (particularly the right-wing "Red" faction). Political demonstrations from the peronist party were forbidden after the 1955 coup, by the Presidential Decree 4161/56, however, five days after Illia's inaugural, a Peronist commemorative act for the 17 October (in honor of the date in 1945 when labor demonstrations propelled Perón to power) took place in Buenos Aires' Plaza Miserere without any official restrictions. Illia similarly lifted electoral restrictions, allowing the participation of Peronists in the 1965 legislative elections. The prohibition over the Communist Party of Argentina and the pro-industry MID (which many in the military, then controlled by cattle barons, termed "economic criminals") was also lifted. Among Illia's early landmark legislation was an April 1964 bill issuing felony penalties for discrimination and racial violence, which he presented in an address to a joint session of Congress.

Domestically, Illia pursued a pragmatic course, restoring Frondizi's vigorous public works and lending policies, but with more emphasis on the social aspect and with a marked, nationalist shift away from Frondizi's support for foreign investment. This shift was most dramatic in Illia's energy policy.

The newspaper La Nación would later write of his presidency, "It is not easy to find a president more denigrated and attacked during the exercise of power than Arturo Umberto Illia. Until the end, he remained calm and prudent in governing an intense country."

Petroleum policy
During his presidential campaign, Arturo Illia promised to dissolve both the Investment Guarantee Agreement, as well as the oil contracts that were made during the Arturo Frondizi government without complying with legal regulations. Once in power, Illia announced that contracts that had been made illegally would be annulled, on 15 November 1963, Illia issued the decrees 744/63 and 745/63, which rendered said oil contracts null and void, for being considered "illegitimate and harmful to the rights and interests of the Nation."  

Frondizi had begun, during his 1958–62 presidency, a policy of oil exploration based on concessions of oil wells to foreign private corporations, leaving the state oil company Yacimientos Petrolíferos Fiscales (YPF) the sole responsibility of exploration and buying oil from private extractors. Arguing that such contracts were negative for the Argentine state and its people (YPF had to assume all the risks of investing in exploration of new wells, the price of oil had risen steadily since the contracts were negotiated, etc.), Illia denounced the Frondizi policy as negative for national Argentine interests, and promised to render the contracts of concession void, renegotiating them.

Minimum, Vital and Mobile Wage Law
On 15 June 1964, the Law 16.459 was passed, establishing a minimum wage for the country.
"Avoiding the exploitation of workers in those sectors in which an excess of workforce may exist", "Securing an adequate minimum wage" and "Improving the income of the poorest workers" were listed among the objectives of the project. With the same aims, the Law of Supplies was passed, destined to control prices of basic foodstuffs and setting minimum standards for pensions.

Education policy
During Illia's government, education acquired an important presence in the national budget. In 1963, it represented 12% of the budget, rising to 17% in 1964 and to 23% in 1965. On November 5, 1964, the National Literacy Plan was started, with the purpose of diminishing and eliminating illiteracy (At the time, nearly 10% of the adult population was still illiterate). By June 1965, the program comprised 12,500 educational centers and was assisting more than 350,000 adults of all ages.

Medical drugs law

Law 16.462, also known as 'Oñativia Law' (in honor of Minister of Health Arturo Oñativia), was passed on August 28, 1964. It established a policy of price and quality controls for pharmaceuticals, freezing prices for patented medicines at the end of 1963, establishing limits to advertising expenditures and to money sent outside the country for royalties and related payments. The regulation of this law by Decree 3042/65 also required pharmaceutical corporations to present to a judge an analysis of the costs of their drugs and to formalize all their existing contracts.

Economic policy
In the economic sphere, Arturo Illia's presidency was characterised by regulation of the public sector, a decrease of the public debt, and a considerable push for industrialization.

The first confrontations would be with businessmen and unions.  Among the measures that most irritated the business sector were the annulment of oil contracts with foreign companies and the law freezing the price of medicines.

Since Perón's exile, the labor movement functioned as the representation of Peronism in the country. Led by the leader of the UOM, Augusto Vandor, the unions deployed a large-scale Plan of Struggle.  In 1964, millions of workers occupied more than 11 thousand industrial establishments.

Their concerns were not reflected in the economic indices of the period: between 1964 and 1965 there was a recovery that averaged about a 10% annual increase in GDP.

The Syndicate of State Businesses was created, to achieve a more efficient control of the public sector. Among his brief presidency's most notable public works initiatives were the Villa Lugano housing development (in the poorest section of Buenos Aires) and El Chocón Dam, then the largest such project in Argentina.

National GDP had contracted by 2.4% in 1963; it expanded by 10.3% in 1964 and 9.1% in 1965. Industrial GDP had shrunk by 4.1% in 1963; it leapt by 18.9% in 1964 and 13.8% in 1965. The external debt was reduced from 3.4 billion dollars to 2.7 billion.

The median real wage grew by 9.6% during calendar 1964, alone, and had expanded by almost 25%, by the time of the coup. Unemployment declined from 8.8% in 1963, to 5.2% on 1966.

Ironically, the Argentine middle class (who were generally as anxious as anyone to see President Illia leave office) benefited even more: auto sales leapt from 108,000 in 1963 to 192,000 in 1965 (a record at the time).

Foreign policy 

The Illia government combined the old Yrigoyen tradition of "Krausist idealism" and "universalism", The first component was evidenced in the constant references of Illia and his foreign minister Miguel Angel Zavala Ortiz to a peaceful universal order, based on justice and not on the realistic criterion of the balance of power, and Americanism. In turn, the developmental component appeared in their references to the importance of the Alliance for Progress, the need to achieve integration and development at the national and continental level, and the inequality of economic opportunities between developed countries and developing countries as the main cause of global conflict.

Illia pronounced on 12 October 1963 -day of his assumption- before the Legislative Assembly: "Peace no longer consists only in the balance of power of the great powers but also in giving the undeveloped nations the opportunities and the means to eliminate the tremendous humiliation of their inequality and the misery in which their inhabitants live. To universalize peace, progress and well-being must be universalized. America cannot be solely a geographical nomenclature, but must be an active oriented and guiding unit, complementary to a universal order."

During his government illia revived the state visit of Charles de Gaulle, Giuseppe Saragat, Eduardo Frei Montalva, Mohammad Reza Pahlavi, Princess Margrethe, among others.

Public image and the media 
In this climate of democratic fragility, the press mounted an active campaign that contributed to the military coup. They accused the president of being slow and ineffective, they represented him as a turtle or with a dove on his head; at the same time they argued that modernization required overcoming parliament and portrayed Juan Carlos Onganía as a messianic leader who would bring order.

A campaign against Illia was systematically carried out by peronist journalists and press groups that supported former populist president Peron, who had been deposed and was currently in exile, and sought to bring him back to power. The defamatory push was spearhead by as Mariano Grondona in Primera Plana, a rightwing peronist publication. Illia was often portrayed as a turtle and characterized as timid and lacking  energy. Simultaneously, the personality of military chiefs was highlighted, particularly Juan Carlos Onganía, contrasting him with the image of politicians, encouraging their intervention to "safeguard the Homeland."

A coup was not only supported by the more conservative sectors, that where aligned with the military, but also by the peronist movement led by Justicialist Party along several aligned trade union.

1966 coup 
On 28 June 1966, on a cold winter morning, the military coup took place amid the indifference of the citizens. The military forced Arturo Illia to abandon the presidency and take power again.

General Julio Rodolfo Alsogaray, Brigadier Rodolfo Pío Otero —head of the Casa Rosada Military House—, Colonel Luis Perlinger and a group of officers appeared at the presidential office to request that he leave the Government House, assuring him at all times their physical integrity. He flatly refused and after a heated discussion he told them: "I am the commander in chief of the Armed Forces," causing the military to leave the office. Faced with the strong refusal, the police officers entered with gas launchers, while the troops completely surrounded the Casa Rosada. Perlinger again asked the president to leave, assuring him that otherwise "he could not guarantee the safety of the people who accompanied him." Finally, Illia chose to leave the place.

Surrounded by his collaborators, he went down the stairs to the ground floor, crossed the entrance and went to the street, he was able to reach the exit door of the Government House surrounded by a lot of people who kept shouting ... They offered him a car of the presidency, but rejected it. At that he saw the one who had been his Minister of Education, Alconada Aramburú, approaching among the people and telling him to go with him. She followed him and they got into his car. Inside were seven people. Thus we got to his brother's house in the Buenos Aires town of Martínez. The following day, General Juan Carlos Onganía took office, calling the coup the Argentine Revolution.

Cabinet  
Throughout his presidency he held the same cabinet members, except for Eugenio Blanco, who died in office, and had to be replaced by Juan Carlos Pugliese in August 1964.

Subsequent activity and death 

Illia lost his wife, Silvia Martorell, to cancer on September 1966, the same year was deposed. For a short while he lived in the Buenos Aires suburb of Martínez, though he would make frequent trips to Córdoba. Illia retired from politics. He returned to Cruz del Eje, Córdoba  where he resumed his medical practice as a rural doctor often attending patients for free.

He died in Cruz del Eje on 18 January 1983, at the age of 82, shortly before the return of democracy. Following a state memorial in Congress, Arturo Umberto Illia was buried in La Recoleta Cemetery, in Buenos Aires.

Homages 

The Arturo Umberto Illia House Museum located at 181 Avellaneda street in the downtown neighborhood of Cruz del Eje, in the Province of Córdoba, Argentina, was declared a National Historic Monument on 27 November 2001, by Law 25,533.

The House-Museum constitutes a unique and relevant heritage, which was established in the center of the town of Cruz del Eje and is the faithful reflection of its owner, Arturo Illia. The house itself is typical middle class, built and Art Deco style, with the balcony above the garage, three bedrooms, dining room, bathroom, kitchen and living room.

Honours 

 : Collar of the Order of Merit (29 October 1965)
 : Knight Grand Cross of the Order of the Legion of Honour (October 1964)
 : Knight Grand Cross with collar of the Order of Merit of the Italian Republic (8 September 1965)

References

Further reading

 Arturo Illia, su vida, principios y doctrina, by Ricardo Illia, Ediciones Corregidor.
 La caída de Illia, by Mario Antonio Verone, Editorial Coincidencia.
 Historia del radicalismo, by Mario Monteverde, GAM Ediciones.
 La presidencia de Illia, by Pedro Sánchez, CEAL.
 Poder militar y sociedad política en Argentina (Tomo II, 1943–1973), by Alan Rouquié, Emecé Editores.
 ¿Qué es el radicalismo?, by Raúl Alfonsín, Editorial Sudamericana.

Presidents of Argentina
Members of the Argentine Chamber of Deputies elected in Córdoba
Vice Governors of Córdoba Province, Argentina
Radical Civic Union politicians
Argentine Roman Catholics
People from Pergamino
Argentine people of Italian descent
University of Buenos Aires alumni
1900 births
1983 deaths
Burials at La Recoleta Cemetery
20th-century Argentine physicians